August Rohling (15 February 1839 at Neuenkirchen, Province of Westphalia, Prussia – 23 January 1931 in Salzburg) was a German Catholic theologian, student of anti-Semitic texts, and polemical author.

He studied at Münster and Paris, and became professor successively at the University of Münster, Milwaukee, and Charles University in Prague, retiring in 1901.

He wrote polemics against Protestantism and Judaism. Of his anti-Jewish works Der Talmudjude (Münster, 1871) became a standard work for anti-Semitic authors and journalists. It is a faulty abstract of the Entdecktes Judenthum of Johann Andreas Eisenmenger.

The book first appeared when Bismarck inaugurated his anti-Catholic legislation, as a retort to the attacks made by liberal journals on the dogma of papal infallibility and on Jesuitic textbooks. The book was extensively quoted by the Catholic press, but it did not become a political force until the appearance of anti-Semitism, and the Tiszaeszlár Affair in 1883. Franz Delitzsch defended Judaism against the attacks of Rohling. At the same time Josef Samuel Bloch wrote articles in which he accused Rohling of ignorance and of forgery of the texts. Rohling sued Bloch for libel, but withdrew the suit at the last moment. Later on he greeted the appearance of Zionism as the solution of the Jewish question and wrote a pamphlet against Güdemann's "Das Judenthum in Seinen Grundzügen," etc.

Those of Rohling's works which concern the Jews are, in addition to "Der Talmudjude":

"Katechismus des 19. Jahrhunderts für Juden und Protestanten," Mayence, 1878
"Franz Delitzsch und die Judenfrage," Prague, 1881
"Fünf Briefe über den Talmudismus und das Blutritual der Juden," ib. 1881
"Die Polemik und das Menschenopfer des Rabbinismus," Paderborn, 1883;
"Die Ehre Israels: Neue Briefe an die Juden," Prague, 1889
"Auf nach Zion," ib. 1901
"Das Judenthum nach Neurabbinischer Darstellung der Hochfinanz Israels," Munich, 1903.

Of the polemical literature against Rohling the oldest work is Kroner's "Entstelltes, Unwahres und Erfundenes in dem Talmudjuden Professor Dr. August Rohling's," Münster, 1871. Distinguished by scholarship are the two pamphlets of Delitzsch, "Rohling's Talmudjude Beleuchtet" (Leipzig, 1881) and "Schachmatt den Blutlügnern Rohling und Justus" (2d ed., Erlangen, 1883).

See also
Criticism of the Talmud

References

Further reading
Ottův Slovnίk Naučný, xxi. 895, Prague, 1904.
Oesterreichische Wochenschrift.
Mittheilungen des Vereins zur Bekämpfung des Antisemitismus.?

External links
Source

1839 births
1931 deaths
19th-century German Catholic theologians
Late modern Christian antisemitism
Academic staff of Charles University
People from Steinfurt (district)
People from the Province of Westphalia
Academic staff of the University of Münster
University of Wisconsin–Milwaukee faculty